The X-38 was an experimental re-entry vehicle designed by NASA to research a possible emergency crew return vehicle (CRV) for the International Space Station (ISS). The 1995–2002 program also developed concepts for a crew return vehicle design that could be modified for other uses, such as a possible joint U.S. and international human spacecraft that could be launched on the French Ariane 5 booster.

The program would eventually develop a total of three test prototype flight demonstrators for the proposed Crew Return Vehicle, each having incremental improvements on its predecessor. All three were wingless lifting body vehicles used in drop tests. The X-38 program was canceled in 2002 due to budget cuts.

History

The maximum crew size for the ISS is dependent on crew rescue capacity. Since it is imperative that the crew members be able to return to Earth in case of an unexpected emergency, a Crew Return Vehicle able to hold up to seven crew members was initially planned by the ISS program leadership. This would have allowed the full complement of seven astronauts to live and work on the ISS.

During the early years of ISS on-orbit construction, the crew was limited to three, corresponding to a single Russian Soyuz TMA vehicle that could be docked to the station at any given time. Later in May 2009 provisions were added for a total of two docked Soyuz vehicles simultaneously and the ISS crew was increased to 6 members.   NASA has designed several crew return vehicles over the years with varying levels of detail.

A small, in-house development study of the X-38 concept first began at Johnson Space Center (JSC) in early 1995, however several types of emergency scenarios were recognized by NASA as early as 1992 that drove the need for crew return from the International Space Station:
1. A serious illness or injury to a station astronaut
2. A fire or collision with space debris
3. Grounding of the space shuttle so that it could not deliver life-sustaining supplies.

In early 1996, a contract was awarded to Scaled Composites, Inc., of Mojave, Calif., for the construction of three full-scale atmospheric test airframes. The first vehicle airframe was delivered to JSC in September 1996.

Development
In an unusual move for an X-plane, the program involved the European Space Agency and the German Space Agency DLR. It was originally called X-35. The program manager was John Muratore, while the Flight Test Engineer was future NASA astronaut Michael E. Fossum.

Rob Meyerson, who later went on to become President of Blue Origin, was an early member of the team.

The X-38 design used a wingless lifting body concept originally developed by the U.S. Air Force in the mid-1960s during the X-24 program. R. Dale Reed worked for NASA from 1955-2000 and is considered the Father of the Lifting Body Programs. He met with Muratore (1992-93) and shared his design of the X-24A that he used to present the concept of the X-38 to NASA (Wingless Flight, Chapter 9, pages 186-88).

The X-38 program used uncrewed mockups to test the CRV design. Flight models were indicated with the letter V for "Vehicle" followed by a number.
X-38 V-131
X-38 V-132
X-38 V-131-R, which was the V-131 prototype reworked with a modified shell
X-38 V-201, which was an orbital prototype to be launched by the Space Shuttle
X-38 V-121, V-133 and V-301 were also foreseen, but were never built.

The X-38 V-131 and V-132 shared the aerodynamic shape of the X-24A. This shape had to be enlarged for the Crew Return Vehicle needs (crew of seven astronauts) and redesigned, especially in the rear part, which became thicker.

The X-38 V-131-R was designed at 80 percent of the size of a CRV [, ], and featured the final redesigned shape (Two later versions, V-133 and V-201, were planned at 100 percent of the CRV size). The 80% scale versions were flown at 15,000 to 24,000 pound weight.  The X-38 V-201 orbital prototype was 90 percent complete, but never flown.

The later prototypes had their descent continue under a  parafoil wing, the largest ever made. Flight control was mostly autonomous, backed up by a ground-based pilot.

Design

The X-38 was intended to be semi-permanently docked to the ISS.  If the crew became sick or injured during the course of their mission, they would enter the rescue vehicle through a hatched docking mechanism.  With execution of a short procedure, the crew return vehicles would automatically fly the crew members safely to Earth.  Once undocked, the vehicle would be deorbited using a deorbital propulsion system (DPS).  The eight-thruster DPS would adjust the spacecraft's attitude and retrofire to slow the X-38 down, allowing gravitational attraction to pull it back into Earth's atmosphere. A DPS module was developed by Aerojet and delivered to Johnson Space Center in 2002 for V-201.

Following the jettison of the DPS, the X-38 would have glided from orbit and used a steerable parafoil for its final descent and landing. The high speeds at which lifting body aircraft operate can make them challenging to land. The parafoil would have been used to slow the vehicle and make landing easier. The landing gear consisted of skids rather than wheels: the skids worked like sleds so the vehicle would have slid to a stop on the ground.

Both the shape and size of the X-38 were different from that of the Space Shuttle. The Crew Return Vehicle would have fitted into the payload bay of the shuttle. This does not, however, mean that it would have been small. The X-38 weighed 10,660 kg and was 9.1 meters long. The battery system, lasting nine hours, was to be used for power and life support. If the Crew Return Vehicle was needed, it would only take two to three hours for it to reach Earth.

The parafoil parachute, employed for landing, was derived from technology developed by the U.S. Army. This massive parafoil deploys in 5 stages for optimum performance. A drag chute would have been released from the rear of the X-38. This drag chute would have been used to stabilize and slow the vehicle down. The parafoil (area of 687 square meters) was then released. It would open in five steps (a process called staging). While the staging process only takes 45 seconds, it is important for a successful chute deployment. Staging prevents high-speed winds from tearing the parafoil.

The spacecraft's landing was to be completely automated. Mission Control would have sent coordinates to the onboard computer system. This system would also have used wind sensors and the Global Positioning System (a satellite-based coordinate system) to coordinate a safe trip home. Since the Crew Return Vehicle was designed with medical emergencies in mind, it made sense that the vehicle could find its way home automatically in the event that crew members were incapacitated or injured. If there was a need, the crew would have the capability to operate the vehicle by switching to the backup systems. In addition, seven high altitude low opening (HALO) parachute packs were included in the crew cabin, a measure designed to provide for the ability to bail out of the craft.

An Advanced Docking Berthing System (ADBS) was designed for the X-38 and the work on it led to the Low Impact Docking System the Johnson Space Center later created for the planned vehicles in Project Constellation.

The X-38 vehicle was also known as the X-35 (but that designation was already allocated by the USAF to another vehicle) and X-CRV (experimental - Crew Return Vehicle)

Cancellation 
Severe cost overruns plagued the ISS program during its development and construction during the late 1990s and early 2000s.  To bring costs under control the International Space Station Management and Cost Evaluation (IMCE) Task Force was created.  The task force introduced a new concept known as "American Core Complete", whereby the U.S. would unilaterally reduce the previously agreed-upon American contributions to the ISS while retaining its role as the controlling member of the International partners.  Core Complete (as opposed to the originally planned "Station Complete") deleted the American Habitation Module, the American CRV, and Node-3 from the ISS design without any negotiations with international partners. NASA Administrator, Sean O'Keefe, appointed by President George W. Bush, stated in December 2001 that he intended to adhere to the recommendations of the IMCE, including the implementation of Core Complete. The X-38 project cancellation was announced on April 29, 2002 as a cost-cutting measure in accordance with the IMCE's recommendations.

The Core Complete concept was roundly criticized by many experts at the time since a majority of development work on the X-38 had been completed.  The prototype space vehicle was approximately 90% complete at the time it was cancelled.

Legacy and vehicle redeployment
The X-38 V-132 is now on permanent loan from NASA to the Strategic Air and Space Museum at Ashland, Nebraska.

 the 90% complete X-38 V-201, having been moved out of Building 220  at Johnson Space Center- is now sitting outside Building 49 wrapped in construction webbing at Johnson Space Center, Houston, Texas.

, the X-38 V-131R is on loan from NASA to the Evergreen Aviation Museum in McMinnville, Oregon.

Specifications

See also

Notes

References

External links

 NASA Dryden X-38 Photo Collection
 NASA Dryden X-38 Movie Collection

Edwards Air Force Base
Spaceplanes
Crewed spacecraft
International Space Station
1990s United States experimental aircraft
Lifting bodies
Cancelled spacecraft
Articles containing video clips
Aircraft first flown in 1999